Heiko Echter von der Leyen (born 2 June 1955 in Hanover) is a German physician and member of the noble family von der Leyen. 

Von der Leyen is married to the President of the European Commission, Ursula von der Leyen.

Since December 2020, he is Medical Director of the company Orgenesis which is specialised in cell and gene therapies.

Life
Born in 1955, the son of physician Ulrich von der Leyen (1918–1992) and his wife Cornelia Maria née Groth (1922–2014), he studied Medicine at the University of Hamburg before pursuing further studies at Hanover Medical School. He joined the faculty of Stanford University from 1992 to 1996. He received his Habilitation doctorate at Hanover Medical School in 1998 becoming Adjunct Professor of Internal Medicine and Experimental Cardiology at Hanover Medical School in 2002.

Von der Leyen became the Director of Hanover Clinical Trial Center GmbH in 2005; Hanover Clinical Trial Center (HCTC) is an academic clinical research organization located at the campus of Hanover Medical School.

His family are Lutheran members of the Evangelical Church of Germany. Heiko married Ursula née Albrecht in 1986 and they have seven children.

References

German expatriates in the United States
1955 births
Living people
University of Hamburg alumni
Stanford University alumni
Stanford University School of Medicine faculty
Spouses of German politicians
German cardiologists
German untitled nobility